Hardy Williams (April 14, 1931 – January 7, 2010) was an American politician who served as a Democratic member of the Pennsylvania State Senate for the 8th district from 1983 to 1998.

Background
He faced criticism in the 1980s for questions over his campaign finance practices. In 1998, he retired hours before the deadline to file nominating petitions, allowing his son Anthony Hardy Williams the opportunity to run unopposed for his father's 8th senatorial district seat. The younger Williams had already filed his nominating petitions to run for his House seat, so he remained on both ballots. He resigned his House seat when he won both elections simultaneously.

Hardy Williams died on January 7, 2010, at the Kearsley Home in the Wynnefield section of Philadelphia.

References

External links

1931 births
2010 deaths
Pennsylvania state senators
Members of the Pennsylvania House of Representatives
Neurological disease deaths in Pennsylvania
Deaths from Alzheimer's disease
Politicians from Philadelphia